Sin Bandera (English: Without A Flag) is the eponymous debut album from Sin Bandera. It was released by Sony Music Latin on March 26, 2002. The album earned the band the Latin Grammy Award for Best Pop Album by a Duo or Group with Vocals in the 3rd Annual Latin Grammy Awards on September 18, 2002, and was nominated for a Grammy Award for Best Latin Pop Album in the 44th Annual Grammy Awards on February 23, 2003.

Track listing

Sales and certifications

References

External links
 

2002 debut albums
Sin Bandera albums
Spanish-language albums
Sony Discos albums
Latin Grammy Award for Best Pop Album by a Duo or Group with Vocals